Berberis ahrendtii is an Indian shrub in the barberry family first described as a species in 1926. The name given to it at that time had to be changed later because it was discovered that the 1926 name was a homonym of a name applied to a  Venezuelan plant in 1863.

Berberis ahrendtii is known only from the Chamoli and Pithoragarh districts of Uttarakhand in northern India. The species was long thought to be extinct because it had not been collected in nearly 100 years until living populations were discovered recently.

Sources

ahrendtii
Flora of West Himalaya
Plants described in 1926